The 2016–17 Copa Catalunya was the 18th season of Copa Catalunya. This season the competition was reduced from 32 to 28 teams.

The Final Four was played at the Pavelló Municipal in Salou. Mataró Parc Boet won the title.

For the first time an All Star match was played by the best players of each group. The All Star Game was played at Parc Esportiu Llobregat in Cornellà de Llobregat. The All Star replaced the Copa Federació that played the last seasons.

Format

Regular season
28 teams are divided in two groups by geographical criteria.

Final Stage
The Final Stage will be played in play-off ties in a two-legged format, with the exception of the final four.

Relegation PlayOffs
In the relegation playoffs, teams played against each other must win two games to win the series. The winners remain at Copa Catalunya for the next season.

Teams

Promotion and relegation (pre-season)
A total of 28 teams contest the league, including 17 sides from the 2015–16 season and ten promoted from the 2015–16 CC 1ª Categoria. 
On July 7, 2016, AB El Vendrell exchanges a place on CC 2ª Categoria with AD Torreforta. On July 19, 2016, CB Valls Nutrion Internacional achieved a vacant on Liga EBA. On July 20, 2016, Mataró-Feimat and CB Cerdanyola al Dia achieved a vacant on Liga EBA. Finally, CB Viladecans-Sant Gabriel renounces his place in Liga EBA

Teams promoted from CC 1ª Categoria
Club Natació Sabadell
CB Santa Coloma
Sant Gervasi
AE Badalonès
Whats Up!-BasquetPiaSabadell
Verma Alquiler de Maquinaria-CB Salou
CB Sant Narcís
Sant Quirze Basquet Club
CB Cantaires Tortosa
Basquet Sant Boi

Venues and locations

Regular season

Group 1

1 CB Sant Narcís exchanges a place on Liga EBA with CE Sant Nicolau

Group 2

1 CB Cantaires Tortosa achieved a vacant on Liga EBA.
2 Aracena AEC Collblanc B resigned to its place in Copa Catalunya.

Relegation PlayOffs
The first legs were played on 13 May 2017, the second legs on 20 May 2017 and the third legs, if necessary, on 27 May 2017. 

|}

Final round

Quarter-finals
The first legs will be played on 13–14 May, and the second legs will be played on 20–21 May 2017.

|}

Final four
Games played at Pavelló Municipal in Salou

Bracket

Semifinals

Third place game

Championship game

Awards

MVP

 Dario Naharro (Mataró Parc Boet)

All Star Game
The 2017 Copa Catalunya All-star event was held on January 7, 2017 at Parc Esportiu Llobregat in Cornellà de Llobregat.

The White team won the game 78-75. The MVP of the game was Alex López who scored 11 points along with 4 rebounds, Juli Garrote won de 3 points Contest and Marquie Smith won the Slam Dunk Contest.

References and notes

Copa Catalunya
Copa Catalunya
Copa Catalunya